Acne keloidalis nuchae (also known as "acne keloidalis", "dermatitis papillaris capillitii", "folliculitis keloidalis", "folliculitis keloidis nuchae", and "nuchal keloid acne") is a destructive scarring folliculitis that occurs almost exclusively on the occipital scalp of people of African descent, primarily men. 

AKN is characterized by firm pink or flesh-colored hyperpigmented bumps in the skin, which are usually located on the back of the neck. This is mainly because men often cut their hair very low as opposed to women, allowing the hair to prick the occipital scalp thereby causing irritation. Acne keloidalis nuchae most commonly presents itself in individuals aged 13 to 25. The disease is closely related to pseudofolliculitis barbae and both occur frequently in black men in the military, where it is so common that the US Army has developed official protocols for management. Prolonged cases of AKN can cause keloid formation due to chronic irritation from folliculitis. Bacterial folliculitis and acne can mimic the appearance of AKN; however, unlike acne, comedones are not seen with AKN.

Treatments for AKN aim to reduce inflammation and prevent infections and scarring. Therapies for AKN may include topical antibiotics, topical or intralesional corticosteroids, and laser hair removal. Recommended modifications to shaving habits include liberal use of shaving cream, avoidance of stretching the skin while shaving, and use of a single-blade razor rather than a razor with multiple blades.

See also
 List of cutaneous conditions

References

External links 

Acneiform eruptions
Scarring